Arkleby is a village in Cumbria, England. It is located about 1 mile south of Aspatria and 9 miles south-west of Wigton. Arkleby is part of the civil parish of Plumbland and is a short distance from the village of Parsonby and larger village of Plumbland. Arkleby Hall, a farmhouse, dates from 1725 and is a Grade II listed building. St Cuthbert's Church, the parish church of Plumbland, is located in between Arkleby and Parsonby. The church was built in 1871 by J.A. Cory, incorporating the fabric of an earlier 13th century church on the site; it is a Grade II listed building.

See also

Listed buildings in Plumbland

References

External links

Villages in Cumbria
Plumbland